The Shigar Valley is a valley in Gilgit Baltistan in northern Pakistan that is watered by the Shigar River, and centred on the town of Shigar. The valley stretches about 170 km from Skardu to Askole and is the gateway to the high mountains of the Karakoram. The town of Shigar is the largest settlement in valley. Even though the Shigar Valley is a remote and largely inaccessible place, there are several villages in the valley. Askole is the last settlement in the Shigar Valley, which is still far from the high mountains. Shigar was an administrative sub-division of Skardu District that is now a district in its own right.

This valley is a stream of the Indus River, which is near to the town of Skardu. It is a popular destination for hiking, trekking and mountaineering, despite the tough conditions there.  Also, the valley is an attraction for the tourists as it is a gateway to Karakoram Hills, one of the world's highest peaks is K2.

Two ethnic groups exist, which speak Shina language and Gujari language.
The local Balti community´s use of medicinal plants has been surveyed in an ethnobotanical study.

See also
Askole
Skardu

References

External links

https://gbit.pk/10-beautiful-places-visit-shigar-valley-skardu-baltistan/
Photos from Shigar by Arif A Khan

Baltistan
Populated places in Shigar District
Valleys of Gilgit-Baltistan
Shigar District